Vesislav Ilchev (born 27 May 1977) is a Bulgarian football defender, who currently plays for Master Burgas in the Bulgarian V Football Group.There's a wife and child Rosica and Simona.

External links
 Player Profile at Burgas24

Bulgarian footballers
1977 births
Living people
Association football defenders
FC Chernomorets Burgas players
First Professional Football League (Bulgaria) players